The Quezon Protected Landscape is a protected area in the Republic of the Philippines, spanning the municipalities of Pagbilao, Padre Burgos and Atimonan in Quezon province.

Protected area
The park was first established as a national park on October 25, 1934, with Proclamation no. 740. After the implementation of the National Integrated Protected Areas System (NIPAS) in 1992, the park was reclassified as a protected landscape.

Park features

Quezon Protected Landscape is situated in the southern Sierra Madre mountain range on Luzon island. 
The landscape is lowland rainforest with karst landscape and vegetation.  Activities in the park include bird watching, hiking to Mount Mirador (See below), trekking to view the flora and fauna, or trekking to the  Bantakay Falls in Brgy. Sta. Catalina.  There are least five waterfalls in the park with Bantakay, the most accessible.  Near the falls is Bantakay Caves which is open for exploring.  Some of the other caves in the park include Cueva Santa and Nilubugan Cave.

Inside the park are several areas cleared for camping with Niyugan campsite as one of the preferred campsite.

Fauna
The park is known for its virgin forest teeming with numerous wildlife, with several species endemic to the Philippines.  Some of the species in the park are the monitor lizard, monkey, deer, wild pig, parrot, dove, pigeon, jungle fowl (manok labuyo), yellow bittern, cinnamon bittern, buff-banded rail, barred rail, white-browed crake, marsh sandpiper, long-toed stint, Swinhoe's snipe, striated grassbird, rufous hornbill, Luzon hornbill, pink-bellied imperial pigeon, guaiabero, colasisi, blackish cuckooshrike, flaming sunbird and flowerpecker.

In April 2010, the Northern Sierra Madre Forest monitor lizard Varanus bitatawa (local name: butikaw) was discovered by the western world.  The lizard has long been known to the Aeta and Ilongot indigenous peoples who have used it as a food source.

Historical significance
During the Philippine Revolution, the Philippine flag was raised on the mountain signifying the conquest of the region. The American and Japanese flags were also hoisted on the mountain during their colonization, and in 1946 when the Philippine flag was raised there again after the country gained independence. Also called Mount Pinagbanderahan, literally meaning "where the flag was hoisted", the mountain is easily accessible via a stairway, which takes about an hour or so to climb. The summit is a vantage point for viewing nearby mountains like Mount Banahaw, the island provinces of Marinduque or Mindoro and the major towns of Quezon.

Accessibility

The protected landscape is easily accessible via the Pan-Philippine Highway, the national highway that connects the whole country, which traverses the middle of the park. That road that cuts through the park includes a zigzag section (also known to the locals as "Bitukang Manok", in english "Chicken gut") open only to light vehicles. A longer diversion road bypasses that part of the road.

See also
List of protected areas of the Philippines
Ecoregions in the Philippines

References

External links
Philippines Department of Tourism Brochure - Quezon National Park

Protected landscapes of the Philippines
Forests of the Philippines
Protected areas of the Sierra Madre (Philippines)
Protected areas established in 1934
1934 establishments in the Philippines
Military history of the Philippines during World War II
Geography of Quezon
Tourist attractions in Quezon